"I've Got a Winner in You" is a song co-written and recorded by American country music artist Don Williams.  It was released in February 1978 as the second single from the album Country Boy.  The song reached number 7 on the Billboard Hot Country Singles & Tracks chart.  The song was written by Williams and Wayland Holyfield.

Chart performance

References

1978 singles
1978 songs
Don Williams songs
Songs written by Wayland Holyfield
Songs written by Don Williams
ABC Records singles